Stoliczkia is a genus of snakes in the family Xenodermidae. The genus contains two species, both from India.

Etymology
The genus is named after Ferdinand Stoliczka, Moravian-born zoologist who later worked for the Geological Survey of India. Many subsequent publications have used the spelling Stoliczkaia. However, Stoliczkia is considered valid because it was repeated twice in Jerdon's original publication, rendering a spelling error unlikely. Moreover, Stoliczkaia Neumayr 1875 is an ammonite genus.

Species
There are two species:
Stoliczkia khasiensis  – Khasi earth snake, Khase red snake
Stoliczkia vanhnuailianai  – Lushai Hills dragon snake

References

Further reading
Boulenger GA (1893). Catalogue of the Snakes in the British Museum (Natural History). Volume I., Containing the Families ... Colubridæ Aglyphæ, part. London: Trustees of the British Museum (Natural History). (Taylor and Francis, printers). xiii + 448 pp. + Plates I-XXVIII. (Genus "Stoliczkaia [sic]", p. 175).
Smith MA (1943). The Fauna of British India, Ceylon and Burma, Including the Whole of the Indo-Chinese Sub-region. Reptilia and Amphibia. Vol. III.—Serpentes. London: Secretary of State for India. (Taylor and Francis, printers). xii + 583 pp. (Genus "Stoliczkaia [sic]", p. 125).

Xenodermidae
Snakes of Asia
Snake genera
Taxa named by Thomas C. Jerdon